The Assemblies of God (AG), officially the World Assemblies of God Fellowship, is a group of over 144 autonomous self-governing national groupings of churches that together form the world's largest Pentecostal denomination. 

As an international fellowship, the member denominations are entirely independent and autonomous, but they are united by shared beliefs and history. The Assemblies of God originated from the Azusa Street Revival of the early 20th century. This revival led to the founding, in 1914, of the Assemblies of God in the United States, the first Finished Work Pentecostal denomination after white ministers separated from the historically African American Church of God in Christ through which many had licenses and ordination credentialing.

Through foreign missionary work and establishing relationships with other Pentecostal churches, the Assemblies of God expanded into a worldwide movement. It was not until 1988 that the world fellowship was formed. As a Pentecostal fellowship, the Assemblies of God believes in the Pentecostal distinctive of baptism with the Holy Spirit with the evidence of speaking in tongues.

The Assemblies of God should not be confused with the Assemblies of God International Fellowship, the International Assemblies of God Fellowship, and the Independent Assemblies of God International, all of which are Pentecostal denominations.

History

Origins

The Assemblies of God has its roots in the Pentecostal Azusa Street Revival of the early 20th century. Established churches generally did not welcome the Pentecostal aspects of the revival, and participants in the new movement soon found themselves forced outside existing religious bodies. These people sought out their own places of worship and founded hundreds of distinctly Pentecostal congregations. By 1914 many ministers and laymen alike began to realize just how far-reaching the spread of the revival and of Pentecostalism had become. Concerned leaders felt the desire to protect and preserve the results of the revival by uniting through cooperative fellowship.

In April 1914, after separating from the black-founded Church of God in Christ over disagreements with governance and credentials, about 300 white preachers and laymen from 20 states and several foreign countries met for a general council in Hot Springs, Arkansas, United States. A new fellowship emerged from the meeting and was incorporated under the name General Council of the Assemblies of God in the United States of America.

In 1916, American pastor F. F. Bosworth, a founding member of the organization, criticized the Assemblies of God Statement of Fundamental Truths for its excessive stance on glossolalia as a mandatory "initial sign" of baptism of the Holy Spirit and left it in 1918. In revising the 1918 declaration, the statement of belief was qualified by leaders to be understood as the "initial physical sign" of the baptism of the Holy Spirit.

In time, self-governing and self-supporting general councils broke off from the original fellowship or formed independently in several nations throughout the world, originating either from indigenous Pentecostal movements or as a direct result of the indigenous missions strategy of the General Council. In 1919, Pentecostals in Canada united to form the Pentecostal Assemblies of Canada, which formally affiliated with the Assemblies of God USA the following year. The Assemblies of God in Great Britain formed in 1924 and would have an early influence on the Assemblies of God in Australia, now known as Australian Christian Churches. The Australian Assemblies of God formed in 1937 through a merger of the Pentecostal Church of Australia and the Assemblies of God Queensland. The Queensland AG had formed in 1929; though, it was never formally affiliated with the AG in America. The Assemblies of God of South Africa, founded in 1925, like the AG Queensland was also not initially aligned with the US fellowship.

Prior to 1967 the Assemblies of God, along with the majority of other Pentecostal denominations, officially opposed Christian participation in war and considered itself a peace church. The US Assemblies of God continues to give full doctrinal support to members who are led by religious conscience to pacifism.

International fellowship

In 1988, the various Assemblies of God national fellowships united to form the World Pentecostal Assemblies of God Fellowship at the initiative of Dr. J. Philip Hogan, then executive director of the Division of Foreign Missions of the Assemblies of God in the United States. The initial purpose was to coordinate evangelism, but soon developed into a more permanent organism of inter-relation.

Dr. Hogan was elected the first chairman of the Fellowship and served until 1992 when Rev. David Yonggi Cho was elected chairman. In 1993, the name of the Fellowship was changed to the World Assemblies of God Fellowship. In 2000, Thomas E. Trask was elected to succeed Cho. At the 2008 World Congress in Lisbon, Portugal, George O. Wood, General Superintendent of the Assemblies of God in the United States, was elected chairman. At the 2011 World AG Congress in Chennai, India, D. Mohan, General Superintendent of the All India Assemblies of God, was elected vice chairman.

Statistics 
According to a denomination census in 2022, it has 367,398 churches and 70,000,000 members worldwide.

Beliefs

The doctrinal position of the Assemblies of God is framed in a classical Pentecostal and evangelical context. The AG is Trinitarian. It believes that the Bible is divinely inspired and the infallible authoritative rule of faith and conduct. Baptism by immersion is practiced as an ordinance which was instituted by Christ for those who have been saved. Baptism is understood as an outward sign of an inward change, the change from being dead in sin to being alive in Christ. As an ordinance, Communion is also practiced.  The AG believes that the elements that are partaken are symbols which express the sharing of the divine nature of Jesus of Nazareth; a memorial of His suffering and death; and a prophecy of His second coming. The Assemblies of God also places a strong emphasis on the fulfillment of the Great Commission and it believes that this is the calling of the church.

As classical Pentecostals, the Assemblies of God believes that all Christians are entitled to and should seek the baptism in the Holy Spirit. The AG teaches that this experience is distinct from and subsequent to the experience of salvation. The baptism in the Holy Spirit empowers the believer for Christian life and service. The initial evidence of the baptism in the Holy Spirit is speaking in tongues "as the Spirit gives utterance" (Acts 2:4), It also believes in the present-day use of other spiritual gifts such as divine healing.

While the World AG Fellowship has a statement of faith which outlines the basic beliefs which unify the various branches of the movement, each national AG denomination formulates its own doctrinal statements. The Assemblies of God USA, for example, adheres to the Statement of Fundamental Truths.

Politics 
The most prominent politician within the Assemblies of God is the ex-Australian prime minister Scott Morrison. He stated "the Bible is not a policy handbook, and I get very worried when people try to treat it like one". In late 2017, Morrison stated that he would become a stronger advocate for protections for religious freedom.

In Brazil, the local branch  has had an increasing influence on politics throughout the early 21st century. The Christian fundamentalist party Patriota is in a parliamental coalition with the Bolsonaro government as well as the centre-right Partido Social Cristão, which is led by the two AoG pastors Everaldo Pereira and Marco Feliciano, who were accused in various cases of crime and sexual misconduct. Everaldo was arrested for his participation in a corruption scheme in the state-owned company of water treatment of the State of Rio de Janeiro, ; however, Feliciano proved his innocence and that he was a victim of a conspiracy planned by former PSC member Patricia Lelis, who was charged with false reporting and extortion before fleeing to the United States, where she was again charged and arrested for the same crime.

Another Brazilian politician and AoG member, Marina Silva, pursues ecologist ideas and supports the rights of the indigenous tribes of her country. Silva has been at times criticized by the church leadership for her leftist stance on many issues such as drug reform.

Within the United States of America, the majority of its membership vote or lean Republican. During Donald Trump's presidency, General Superintendent George O. Wood attended the National Day of Prayer and praised an executive order allowing ministers and religious organizations the ability to support and advocate for political candidates.

Organization
 
The World Fellowship unites Assemblies of God national councils from around the world together for cooperation. Each national council is fully self-governing and independent and involvement with the World Fellowship does not limit this independence. The work of the World Fellowship is carried out by the Executive Council. Executive Council members represent different regions of the world and serve three-year terms. Africa, Asia Pacific, Latin America/Caribbean, and North America each have four representatives while Europe has three and the Middle East and Southern Asia each have one. They are elected by the General Assembly. Each World Fellowship member is entitled to send one or more delegates to the General Assembly with one vote. The General Assembly also elects the Chairman, Vice Chairman, and Secretary of the World Fellowship. The World Assemblies of God Relief Agency (WAGRA) directs its humanitarian work. At both the national and lower level, the Assemblies of God are generally structured around a form of presbyterian polity, combining the independence of the local church with oversight by district and national councils.

The Assemblies of God has missions programs that are designed to establish self-propagating, self-supporting, and self-governing national church bodies in every country. As of late 2006, the Assemblies of God World Missions Research Office reported constituencies in 212 countries and territories, with over 5,000 adherents added per day. As of 2005, the fellowship operated 859 Bible schools, 1,131 extension programs and 39 seminaries outside the United States.

See also

 List of Assemblies of God National Fellowships
 List of Assemblies of God schools
 List of Assemblies of God people
 World Evangelical Alliance

References

Further reading
 Blumhofer, Edith L. "Assemblies of God." In The Encyclopedia of Christianity, edited by Erwin Fahlbusch and Geoffrey William Bromiley, 143–146. Vol. 1. Grand Rapids: Wm. B. Eerdmans, 1999. 
 Blumhofer, Edith L. Restoring the Faith: The Assemblies of God, Pentecostalism, and American Culture. (1993). 281 pp. A major scholarly study.
 Crowe, Terrence Robert. Pentecostal Unity: Recurring Frustration and Enduring Hopes. (1993). 282 pp.
 Fisher, Lyndel Eugene, “The Theological Antecedents of the Assemblies of God: Baptist and Presbyterian Roots” (PhD dissertation, University of Memphis, 2011). DA3476380.
 McGee, Gary B. 'This Gospel . . . Shall Be Preached': A History and Theology of Assemblies of God Foreign Missions since 1959. Springfield, Mo.: Gospel, 1990. 358 pp.
 Poloma, Margaret M. The Assemblies of God at the Crossroads: Charisma and Institutional Dilemmas. (1989). 309 pp. scholarly study
 Poloma, Margaret M., and John C. Green. The Assemblies of God: Godly Love and the Revitalization of American Pentecostalism (New York University Press; 2010) A sociological study that draws on surveys and interviews conducted in 22 diverse congregations.

External links

 Official Website of the Assemblies of God
 Flower Pentecostal Heritage Center (Assemblies of God archives - one of the largest collections of materials documenting the global Pentecostal movement)

 
Christian organizations established in 1914
Christian denominations established in the 20th century
Pentecostal denominations
Finished Work Pentecostals
Arminian denominations